Scoring algorithm, also known as Fisher's scoring, is a form of Newton's method used in statistics to solve maximum likelihood equations numerically, named after Ronald Fisher.

Sketch of derivation
Let  be random variables, independent and identically distributed with twice differentiable p.d.f. First, suppose we have a starting point for our algorithm , and consider a Taylor expansion of the score function, about :

 

where 

 

Now, setting , using that  and rearranging gives us:

 

We therefore use the algorithm

 

and under certain regularity conditions, it can be shown that .

Fisher scoring

 ..

Under some regularity conditions, if  is a consistent estimator, then  (the correction after a single step) is 'optimal' in the sense that its error distribution is asymptotically identical to that of the true max-likelihood estimate.

See also
Score (statistics)
Score test
Fisher information

References

Further reading

Maximum likelihood estimation